Wartenfels Castle is a ruined castle in the state of Salzburg, Austria.

See also
List of castles in Austria

References
This article was initially translated from the German Wikipedia.

Castles in Salzburg (state)
Ruined castles in Austria